Thomas Edwin Calma,  (born 1953), is an Aboriginal Australian human rights and social justice campaigner, and 2023 senior Australian of the Year. He is the sixth chancellor of the University of Canberra, a post held since January 2014, after two years as deputy chancellor. Calma is the second Aboriginal or Torres Strait Islander person to hold the position of chancellor of any Australian university.

Calma has been involved in Indigenous affairs at a local, community, state, national and international level and worked in the public sector focusing on rural and remote Australia, health, mental health and suicide prevention, education, justice reinvestment, research, reconciliation and economic development. Calma's 2005 Social Justice Report  – focusing on Indigenous health equality – was the catalyst for the Close the Gap campaign.

Calma served as the Aboriginal and Torres Strait Islander Social Justice Commissioner from 2004 to 2010 and as Race Discrimination Commissioner from 2004 until 2009 at the Australian Human Rights Commission. 
 
In 2012 he was awarded an Order of Australia, Officer of the General Division, in recognition of his work as an inspirational advocate for human rights and social justice and distinguished service to the Indigenous community, and in 2013 was named Australian of the Year for the ACT.

On 30 October 2019, Calma was announced as a co-chair on the Senior Advisory Group of the "Indigenous voice to government", convened by Ken Wyatt.

Life
Calma was born in 1953 in Darwin, Northern Territory.

He is an elder of the Kungarakan people and member of the Iwaidja people, whose traditional lands are south-west of Darwin and on the Cobourg Peninsula in the Northern Territory.

Career
Between 1995 and 2002 Calma represented Australia's education and training interests as a senior diplomat in India and Vietnam; in 2003, he served as Senior Adviser for Indigenous Affairs to Philip Ruddock, then Minister of Immigration, Multicultural and Indigenous Affairs.

He has been Co-Chair of Reconciliation Australia since before 2005.

Calma served as Aboriginal and Torres Strait Islander Social Justice Commissioner at the Australian Human Rights Commission from 2004 to 2010 and as the Race Discrimination Commissioner from 2004 until 2009. During this time the Social Justice Report 2005 called on Australian governments to commit to achieving equality for Aboriginal and Torres Strait Islander people in the areas of health and life expectancy within a generation (25 years) and advocated embedding a social determinants philosophy into public policy around health, education, employment, housing and behaviours in order to address Indigenous inequality gaps. This report laid the foundation for the Close the Gap campaign, a collaboration of some 40 Indigenous and non-Indigenous Australian health and human rights peak bodies and groups. Calma founded the Close the Gap Steering Committee for Indigenous Health Equality in 2006 and was its inaugural Chairperson. He retired as Co-Chair of the Steering Committee in 2010.

In 2008, Calma delivered the formal response to the Government's National Apology to the Stolen Generations and since 2009 has been involved with the Australian Literacy and Numeracy Foundation (ALNF) and he currently holds the post of Co-Chair.

Since March 2010 Calma has been the Federal Government-appointed National Coordinator, Tackling Indigenous Smoking.

Calma was instrumental in the establishment of the National Congress of Australia's First Peoples, the development of the inaugural National Aboriginal and Torres Strait Islander Suicide Prevention Strategy, and the promotion of Justice Reinvestment. Calma was one of the first proponents of "justice reinvestment" in Australia, introducing the concept in the Social Justice Report 2009.

He also Chairs the not-for-profit organisation Ninti One Ltd, is the former chair the Cooperative Research Centre for Remote Economic Participation and Patron and Chair of the Poche Centres for Indigenous Health Network.

Calma joined the University of Canberra Council on 21 October 2008 and on 1 January 2012 he was appointed Deputy Chancellor of the University of Canberra. Calma took up his appointment as Chancellor of the University of Canberra on 1 January 2014, and was installed at a ceremony held at the National Press Club on 20 February 2014.  Calma is the first Indigenous male to hold the position of Chancellor of an Australian university. Pat O'Shane was the first female.

Calma was appointed Professor with the University of Sydney's Medical School to Chair the Poche Indigenous Health Network on 1 January 2015.

Among his other roles, he has been a White Ribbon Ambassador since 2005, Patron of Wakakirri since 2009 and Patron of the Media Centre for Education Research Australia (MCERA) since 2018.

On 30 October 2019, Calma was announced as a co-chair on the Senior Advisory Group of the "Indigenous voice to government", convened by Ken Wyatt, along with by Professor Marcia Langton . The Group comprises a total of 20 leaders and experts from across the country. Calma took a year's leave of absence from the role of Co-Chair of Reconciliation Australia in order to undertake his new role.

Honours and awards
In 2012 Calma was appointed an Officer of the Order of Australia (AO) for distinguished service to the Indigenous community as an advocate for human rights and social justice, through contributions to government policy and reform, and to cross cultural understanding. In 2013 he was named the ACT Australian of the Year 2013 for his service and commitment to the Indigenous community as an advocate for human rights and social justice having dedicated his life to improving the lives of Indigenous Australians.

On 20 May 2010, Calma was awarded an honorary Doctorate of Letters from Charles Darwin University in recognition of decades of public service, particularly in relation to his work in education, training and employment in Indigenous communities. On 15 February 2011, Calma was awarded an honorary doctorate of science from Curtin University in recognition of his work, advocacy and leadership in Indigenous health reform and Indigenous affairs. On 16 April 2014, Calma was awarded an honorary doctorate from Flinders University in recognition of his work, advocacy and leadership in Indigenous health reform.

In November 2014, Calma was awarded the Indigenous Allied Health Australia Lifetime Achievement Award in recognition of his lifelong dedication to improving the lives of Indigenous Australians and in 2017 was appointed their inaugural Patron.  
In 2007 Calma was named by The Bulletin magazine as the Most Influential Indigenous Person in Australia; in 2008 he was named GQ magazine's 2008 Man of Inspiration for his work in Indigenous Affairs. Calma was named by Australian Doctor Magazine in 2010 as one of the 50 Most Influential People in medicine in Australia. In May 2012 Dr Calma was appointed an Adjunct Associate Professor at the National Centre for Indigenous Studies at ANU.

In October 2015, Calma was awarded one of four inaugural University of South Australia Alumni Awards for his service to society and in November 2015 was awarded the Public Health Association Australia's Sidney Sax Public Health Medal for notable contribution to the protection and promotion of public health, advancing community awareness of public health measures and advancing the ideals and practice of equity in the provision of health care.

On 1 July 2016, Calma received the Martin Luther King Jr Memorial Flag Award on the 240th anniversary of the United States of America's independence.

In October 2016, Calma was appointed the inaugural Chair of the Atlantic Fellows for Social Equity program led by the University of Melbourne and in January 2017 he was appointed an Adjunct Professor with the University of Queensland.

In May 2017 Calma was one of three Indigenous Australians, along with Lowitja O'Donoghue and Galarrwuy Yunupingu, honoured by Australia Post in the 2017 Legends Commemorative Stamp "Indigenous leaders" series to mark the 50th anniversary of the 1967 referendum.

In May 2018 Calma was inducted into the ACT Honour Walk 2018, while in May 2022 he was elected a Fellow of the Australian Academy of Science. He was elected Fellow of the Academy of the Social Sciences in Australia in November 2022. In January 2023 he was named Senior Australian of the Year.

Selected publications

 Articles published 2007–2011.

References

Living people
Chancellors of the University of Canberra
Australian Aboriginal elders
1953 births
People from Canberra
Officers of the Order of Australia
Fellows of the Australian Academy of Science
Fellows of the Academy of the Social Sciences in Australia